Esperanto ( or ) is the world's most widely spoken constructed international auxiliary language. Created by the Warsaw-based ophthalmologist L. L. Zamenhof in 1887, it was intended to be a universal second language for international communication, or "the international language". Zamenhof first described the language in Dr. Esperanto's International Language, which he published under the pseudonym . Early adopters of the language liked the name Esperanto and soon used it to describe his language. The word  translates into English as "one who hopes".

Within the range of constructed languages, Esperanto occupies a middle ground between "naturalistic" (imitating existing natural languages) and apriori (where features are not based on existing languages). Esperanto's vocabulary, syntax and semantics derive predominantly from languages of the Indo-European group. The vocabulary derives primarily from Romance languages, with some of it influenced from Germanic languages. One of the language's most notable features is its extensive system of derivation, where prefixes and suffixes may be freely combined with roots to generate words, making it possible to communicate effectively with a smaller set of words.

Esperanto is the most successful constructed international auxiliary language, and the only such language with a sizeable population of native speakers, of which there are perhaps several thousand. Usage estimates are difficult, but two estimates put the number of people who know how to speak Esperanto at around 100,000. Concentration of speakers is highest in Europe, East Asia, and South America. Although no country has adopted Esperanto officially,  ("Esperanto-land") is used as a name for the collection of places where it is spoken. The language has also gained a noticeable presence on the internet in recent years, as it became increasingly accessible on platforms such as Duolingo, Wikipedia, Amikumu and Google Translate. Esperanto speakers are often called "Esperantists".

Official use 

Esperanto has not been a secondary official language of any recognized country, but it entered the education systems of several countries, such as Hungary and China.

There were plans at the beginning of the 20th century to establish Neutral Moresnet, in central-western Europe, as the world's first Esperanto state; any such plans came to an end when the Treaty of Versailles awarded the disputed territory to Belgium, effective January 10, 1920. In addition, the self-proclaimed artificial island micronation of Rose Island, near Italy in the Adriatic Sea, used Esperanto as its official language in 1968, and another micronation, the extant Republic of Molossia, near Dayton, Nevada, uses Esperanto as an official language alongside English.

The Chinese government has used Esperanto since 2001 for daily news on china.org.cn. China also uses Esperanto in China Radio International, and for the internet magazine El Popola Ĉinio.

The Vatican Radio has an Esperanto version of its podcasts and its website.

The United States Army has published military phrase books in Esperanto, to be used from the 1950s until the 1970s in war games by mock enemy forces. A field reference manual, FM 30-101-1 Feb. 1962, contained the grammar, English-Esperanto-English dictionary, and common phrases. In the 1970s Esperanto was used as the basis for Defense Language Aptitude Tests.

There is also Education@Internet, which has developed from an Esperanto organization; most others are specifically Esperanto organizations. The largest of these, the Universal Esperanto Association, has an official consultative relationship with the United Nations and UNESCO, which recognized Esperanto as a medium for international understanding in 1954. The Universal Esperanto Association collaborated in 2017 with UNESCO to deliver an Esperanto translation of its magazine UNESCO Courier (Unesko Kuriero en Esperanto). The World Health Organization offers an Esperanto version of the Coronavirus pandemic (COVID-19) occupational safety and health education course.

Esperanto was also the first language of teaching and administration of the International Academy of Sciences San Marino.

The League of Nations made attempts to promote teaching Esperanto in member countries, but the resolutions were defeated mainly by French delegates, who did not feel there was a need for it.

In the summer of 1924, the American Radio Relay League adopted Esperanto as its official international auxiliary language, and hoped that the language would be used by radio amateurs in international communications, but its actual use for radio communications was negligible.

All the personal documents sold by the World Service Authority, including the World Passport, are written in Esperanto, together with English, French, Spanish, Russian, Arabic, and Chinese (the official languages of the United Nations).

History

Creation 

Esperanto was created in the late 1870s and early 1880s by L. L. Zamenhof, a Polish-Jewish ophthalmologist from Białystok, then part of the Russian Empire, but now part of Poland. In the 1870s, just a few years before Zamenhof created Esperanto, Polish was banned in public places in Białystok.

According to Zamenhof, he created the language to reduce the "time and labor we spend in learning foreign tongues", and to foster harmony between people from different countries: "Were there but an international language, all translations would be made into it alone ... and all nations would be united in a common brotherhood." His feelings and the situation in Białystok may be gleaned from an extract from his letter to Nikolai Borovko:

Zamenhof's goal was to create an easy and flexible language that would serve as a universal second language, to foster world peace and international understanding, and to build a "community of speakers".

His original title for the language was simply "the international language", but early speakers grew fond of the name Esperanto, and began to use it as the name for the language just two years after its creation. The name quickly gained prominence, and has been used as an official name ever since.

In 1905, Zamenhof published the Fundamento de Esperanto as a definitive guide to the language. Later that year, French Esperantists organized with his participation the first World Esperanto Congress, an ongoing annual conference, in Boulogne-sur-Mer, France. Zamenhof also proposed to the first congress that an independent body of linguistic scholars should steward the future evolution of Esperanto, foreshadowing the founding of the Akademio de Esperanto (in part modeled after the Académie Française), which was established soon thereafter. Since then, world congresses have been held in different countries every year, except during the two World Wars, and the 2020 COVID-19 pandemic (when it was moved to an online-only event). Since the Second World War, they have been attended by an average of more than 2,000 people, and up to 6,000 people at the most.

Zamenhof wrote that he wanted mankind to "learn and use ... en masse ... the proposed language as a living one". The goal for Esperanto to become a global auxiliary language was not Zamenhof's only goal; he also wanted to "enable the learner to make direct use of his knowledge with persons of any nationality, whether the language be universally accepted or not; in other words, the language is to be directly a means of international communication."

After some ten years of development, which Zamenhof spent translating literature into Esperanto, as well as writing original prose and verse, the first book of Esperanto grammar was published in Warsaw on July 26, 1887. The number of speakers grew rapidly over the next few decades; at first, primarily in the Russian Empire and Central Europe, then in other parts of Europe, the Americas, China, and Japan. In the early years before the world congresses, speakers of Esperanto kept in contact primarily through correspondence and periodicals.

Zamenhof's name for the language was simply  ("International Language"). December 15, Zamenhof's birthday, is now regarded as Zamenhof Day or Esperanto Book Day.

20th century

The autonomous territory of Neutral Moresnet, between what is today Belgium and Germany, had a sizable proportion of Esperanto-speaking citizens among its small and multi-ethnic population. There was a proposal to make Esperanto its official language.

However, neither Belgium nor Germany had ever surrendered its original claim to it. Around 1900, Germany, in particular, was taking a more aggressive stance towards the territory and was accused of sabotage and of obstructing the administrative process to force the issue. It was the First World War, however, that was the catalyst that brought about the end of neutrality. On August 4, 1914, Germany invaded Belgium, leaving Moresnet at first "an oasis in a desert of destruction". In 1915, the territory was annexed by the Kingdom of Prussia, without international recognition. Germany lost the war, Moresnet was returned to Belgium, and today it is the German-speaking Belgian municipality of Kelmis.

After the Great War, a great opportunity seemed to arise for Esperanto when the Iranian delegation to the League of Nations proposed that it be adopted for use in international relations, following a report by Nitobe Inazō, a Japanese official delegate of the League of Nations during the 13th World Congress of Esperanto in Prague. Ten delegates accepted the proposal with only one voice against, the French delegate, Gabriel Hanotaux. Hanotaux opposed all recognition of Esperanto at the League, from the first resolution on December 18, 1920, and subsequently through all efforts during the next three years. Hanotaux did not approve of how the French language was losing its position as the international language and saw Esperanto as a threat, effectively wielding his veto power to block the decision. However, two years later, the League recommended that its member states include Esperanto in their educational curricula. The French government retaliated by banning all instruction in Esperanto in France's schools and universities. The French Ministry of Public Instruction said that "French and English would perish and the literary standard of the world would be debased". Nonetheless, many people see the 1920s as the heyday of the Esperanto movement. During this time, Anarchism as a political movement was very supportive of both anationalism and the Esperanto language.

Fran Novljan was one of the chief promoters of Esperanto in the former Kingdom of Yugoslavia. He was among the founders of the Croatian  (Educational Alliance), of which he was the first secretary, and organized Esperanto institutions in Zagreb. Novljan collaborated with Esperanto newspapers and magazines, and was the author of the Esperanto textbook Internacia lingvo esperanto i Esperanto en tridek lecionoj.

In 1920s Korea, socialist thinkers pushed for the use of Esperanto through a series of columns in The Dong-a Ilbo as resistance to both Japanese occupation as well as a counter to the growing nationalist movement for Korean language standardization. This lasted until the Mukden Incident in 1931, when changing colonial policy led to an outright ban on Esperanto education in Korea.

Official repression 

Esperanto attracted the suspicion of many states. Repression was especially pronounced in Nazi Germany, Francoist Spain up until the 1950s, and the Soviet Union under Stalin, from 1937 to 1956.

In Nazi Germany, there was a motivation to ban Esperanto because Zamenhof was Jewish, and due to the internationalist nature of Esperanto, which was perceived as "Bolshevist". In his work, Mein Kampf, Adolf Hitler specifically mentioned Esperanto as an example of a language that could be used by an international Jewish conspiracy once they achieved world domination. Esperantists were killed during the Holocaust, with Zamenhof's family in particular singled out to be killed. The efforts of a minority of German Esperantists to expel their Jewish colleagues and overtly align themselves with the Reich were futile, and Esperanto was legally forbidden in 1935. Esperantists in German concentration camps did, however, teach Esperanto to fellow prisoners, telling guards they were teaching Italian, the language of one of Germany's Axis allies.

In Imperial Japan, the left wing of the Japanese Esperanto movement was forbidden, but its leaders were careful enough not to give the impression to the government that the Esperantists were socialist revolutionaries, which proved a successful strategy.

After the October Revolution of 1917, Esperanto was given a measure of government support by the new workers' states in the former Russian Empire and later by the Soviet Union government, with the Soviet Esperantist Union being established as an organization that, temporarily, was officially recognized. In his biography on Joseph Stalin, Leon Trotsky mentions that Stalin had studied Esperanto. However, in 1937, at the height of the Great Purge, Stalin completely reversed the Soviet government's policies on Esperanto; many Esperanto speakers were executed, exiled or held in captivity in the Gulag labour camps. Quite often the accusation was: "You are an active member of an international spy organization which hides itself under the name of 'Association of Soviet Esperantists' on the territory of the Soviet Union." Until the end of the Stalin era, it was dangerous to use Esperanto in the Soviet Union, even though it was never officially forbidden to speak Esperanto.

Fascist Italy allowed the use of Esperanto, finding its phonology similar to that of Italian and publishing some tourist material in the language.

During and after the Spanish Civil War, Francoist Spain suppressed anarchists, socialists and Catalan nationalists for many years, among whom the use of Esperanto was extensive, but in the 1950s the Esperanto movement was again tolerated.

Modern history 
In 1954, the United Nations — through UNESCO — granted official support to Esperanto as an international auxiliary language in the Montevideo Resolution. However, Esperanto is still not one of the official languages of the UN.

The development of Esperanto has continued unabated into the 21st century. The advent of the Internet has had a significant impact on the language, as learning it has become increasingly accessible on platforms such as Duolingo, and as speakers have increasingly networked on platforms such as Amikumu. With up to two million speakers, it is the most widely spoken constructed language in the world. Although no country has adopted Esperanto officially, Esperantujo ("Esperanto-land") is the name given to the collection of places where it is spoken.

While many of its advocates continue to hope for the day that Esperanto becomes officially recognized as the international auxiliary language, some (including raŭmistoj) have stopped focusing on this goal and instead view the Esperanto community as a stateless diasporic linguistic group based on freedom of association.

Internet
On May 28, 2015, the language learning platform Duolingo launched a free Esperanto course for English speakers. On March 25, 2016, when the first Duolingo Esperanto course completed its beta-testing phase, that course had 350,000 people registered to learn Esperanto through the medium of English. By July 2018, the number of learners had risen to 1.36 million. On July 20, 2018, Duolingo changed from recording users cumulatively to reporting only the number of "active learners" (i.e., those who are studying at the time and have not yet completed the course), which as of October 2022 stands at 299,000 learners.

On October 26, 2016, a second Duolingo Esperanto course, for which the language of instruction is Spanish, appeared on the same platform and which as of April 2021 has a further 176,000 students. A third Esperanto course, taught in Brazilian Portuguese, began its beta-testing phase on May 14, 2018, and as of April 2021, 220,000 people are using this course and 155,000 people in May 2022. A fourth Esperanto course, taught in French, began its beta-testing phase in July 2020, and as of March 2021 has 72,500 students and 101,000 students in May 2022.

As of October 2018, another online learning platform for Esperanto, has 320,000 registered users, and nearly 75,000 monthly visits. 50,000 users possess at least a basic understanding of Esperanto.

On February 22, 2012, Google Translate added Esperanto as its 64th language. On July 25, 2016, Yandex Translate added Esperanto as a language.

With about  articles, Esperanto Wikipedia (Vikipedio) is the 35th-largest Wikipedia, as measured by the number of articles, and is the largest Wikipedia in a constructed language. About 150,000 users consult the Vikipedio regularly, as attested by Wikipedia's automatically aggregated log-in data, which showed that in October 2019 the website has 117,366 unique individual visitors per month, plus 33,572 who view the site on a mobile device instead.

Linguistic properties

Classification 

Esperanto's phonology, grammar, vocabulary, and semantics are based on the Indo-European languages spoken in Europe. Some evidence has shown that Zamenhof studied German, English, Spanish, Lithuanian, Italian and French and knew 13 different languages, which had an influence on Esparanto's linguistic properties.

Esperanto has been described as "a language lexically predominantly Romanic, morphologically intensively agglutinative, and to a certain degree isolating in character". Typologically, Esperanto has prepositions and a pragmatic word order that by default is subject–verb–object (SVO). Adjectives can be freely placed before or after the nouns they modify, though placing them before the noun is more common. New words are formed through extensive prefixing, suffixing, and compounding.

Phonology 

Esperanto typically has 22 to 24 consonants (depending on the phonemic analysis and individual speaker), five vowels, and two semivowels that combine with the vowels to form six diphthongs. (The consonant  and semivowel  are both written j, and the uncommon consonant  is written with the digraph dz, which is the only consonant that does not have its own letter.) Tone is not used to distinguish meanings of words. Stress is always on the second-to-last vowel in proper Esperanto words, unless a final vowel  is elided, which occurs mostly in poetry.

Consonants 
The 23 consonants are:

There is some degree of allophony:
 The sound  is usually an alveolar trill , but can also be a uvular trill , a uvular fricative , and an alveolar approximant . Many other forms such as an alveolar tap  are done and accepted in practice.

Final clusters are uncommon except in unassimilated names, poetic elision of final , and a very few basic words such as  "hundred" and  "after".

Vowels 
Esperanto has the five vowels found in such languages as Spanish, Modern Hebrew, and Modern Greek.

Since there are only five vowels, a good deal of variation in pronunciation is tolerated. These details often depend on the speaker's native language. A glottal stop may occur between adjacent vowels in some people's speech, especially when the two vowels are the same, as in  "hero" ( or ) and  "great-grandfather" ( or ).

Orthography

Alphabet 
The Esperanto alphabet is based on the Latin script, using a one-sound-one-letter principle, with the exception of [d͡z]. It includes six letters with diacritics: ĉ, ĝ, ĥ, ĵ, ŝ (with a circumflex), and ŭ (with a breve). The alphabet does not include the letters q, w, x, or y, which are only used when writing unassimilated terms or proper names.

The 28-letter alphabet is:

Pronunciation 
All unaccented letters are pronounced approximately as their respective IPA symbols, with the exception of C – //.

Esperanto J and C are used in a way familiar to speakers of German and many Slavic languages, but unfamiliar to most English speakers: J has a Y sound [j~i̯], as in yellow and boy (Esperanto jes has the same pronunciation and meaning as English yes), and C has a "TS" sound [t͡s], as in hits or the zz in pizza. In addition, Esperanto G is always hard, as in give, and Esperanto vowels are pronounced as in Spanish.

The accented letters are:
Ĉ is pronounced like English ch in chatting
Ĝ is pronounced like English g in gem
Ĥ is pronounced like the ch in German  or in the Scottish Gaelic, Scots and Scottish Standard English loch. It is also found sometimes in Scouse as the 'k' in book and 'ck' in chicken.
Ĵ is pronounced like the s in English fusion or the J in French Jacques
Ŝ is pronounced like English sh
Ŭ is pronounced like English w and is primarily used after vowels (e.g. antaŭ)

According to one of Zamenhof's "answers" in the Lingvaj respondoj, the letter n ought to be pronounced [n] in all cases, but the pronunciation [ŋ] is admissible before g, k, ĥ, and indeed the latter is how it is usually pronounced in practice.

Typing diacritics 
Even with the widespread adoption of Unicode, the letters with diacritics (found in the "Latin-Extended A" section of the Unicode Standard) can cause problems with printing and computing, because they are not found on most physical keyboards and are left out of certain fonts.

There are two principal workarounds to this problem, which substitute digraphs for the accented letters. Zamenhof, the inventor of Esperanto, created an "h-convention", which replaces ĉ, ĝ, ĥ, ĵ, ŝ, and ŭ with ch, gh, hh, jh, sh, and u, respectively. If used in a database, a program in principle could not determine whether to render, for example, ch as c followed by h or as ĉ, and would fail to render, for example, the word  properly, unless its component parts were intentionally separated, as in e.g. senc·hava. A more recent "x-convention" has gained ground since the advent of computing. This system replaces each diacritic with an x (not part of the Esperanto alphabet) after the letter, producing the six digraphs cx, gx, hx, jx, sx, and ux.

There are computer keyboard layouts that support the Esperanto alphabet, and some systems use software that automatically replaces x- or h-convention digraphs with the corresponding diacritic letters (for example,  for Microsoft Windows, Mac OS X, and Linux,  for Windows Phone, and Gboard and AnySoftKeyboard for Android).

On Linux, the GNOME, Cinnamon, and KDE desktop environments support the entry of characters with Esperanto diacritics.

Criticisms are levied against the letters with circumflex diacritics, which some find odd or cumbersome, along with their being invented specifically for Esperanto rather than borrowed from existing languages. Additionally, some of them are arguably unnecessary — for example, the use of ĥ instead of x and ŭ instead of w. However, Zamenhof did not choose these letters arbitrarily: In fact, they were inspired by Czech letters with the caron diacritic but replaced the caron with a circumflex for the ease of those who had access to a French typewriter (with a circumflex dead-key). The Czech letter ž was replaced with ĵ to match the French letter j with the same sound. The letter ŭ on the other hand comes from the u-breve used in Latin prosody, and is also speculated to be inspired by the Belarusian Cyrillic letter ў; French typewriters can render it approximately as the French letter ù.

Grammar 

Esperanto words are mostly derived by stringing together roots, grammatical endings, and at times prefixes and suffixes. This process is regular so that people can create new words as they speak and be understood. Compound words are formed with a modifier-first, head-final order, as in English (compare "birdsong" and "songbird," and likewise,  and ). Speakers may optionally insert an o between the words in a compound noun if placing them together directly without the o would make the resulting word hard to say or understand.

Nouns and adjectives have two cases: nominative for grammatical subjects and in general, and accusative for direct objects and (after a preposition) to indicate direction of movement.

Adjectives agree with their nouns; their endings are singular subject  ([a]; rhymes with "ha!"), plural subject  ([ai̯], pronounced "eye"), singular object , and plural object  ([ai̯n]; rhymes with "fine").

The suffix , besides indicating the direct object, is used to indicate movement and a few other things as well.

The six verb inflections consist of three tenses and three moods. They are present tense , future tense , past tense , infinitive mood , conditional mood  and jussive mood  (used for wishes and commands). Verbs are not marked for person or number. Thus,  means "to sing",  means "I sing",  means "you sing", and  means "they sing".

Word order is comparatively free. Adjectives may precede or follow nouns; subjects, verbs and objects may occur in any order. However, the article  "the", demonstratives such as  "that" and prepositions (such as  "at") must come before their related nouns. Similarly, the negative  "not" and conjunctions such as  "and" and  "that" must precede the phrase or clause that they introduce. In copular (A = B) clauses, word order is just as important as in English: "people are animals" is distinguished from "animals are people".

Vocabulary 

This book listed 900 roots; these could be expanded into tens of thousands of words using prefixes, suffixes, and compounding. In 1894, Zamenhof published the first Esperanto dictionary, which had a larger set of roots. The rules of the language allowed speakers to borrow new roots as needed; it was recommended, however, that speakers use most international forms and then derive related meanings from these.

Since then, many words have been borrowed, primarily (but not solely) from the European languages. Not all proposed borrowings become widespread, but many do, especially technical and scientific terms. Terms for everyday use, on the other hand, are more likely to be derived from existing roots;  "computer", for instance, is formed from the verb  "compute" and the suffix  "tool". Words are also calqued; that is, words acquire new meanings based on usage in other languages. For example, the word  "mouse" has acquired the meaning of a computer mouse from its usage in many languages (English mouse, French souris, Dutch muis, Spanish ratón, etc.). Esperanto speakers often debate about whether a particular borrowing is justified or whether meaning can be expressed by deriving from or extending the meaning of existing words.

Some compounds and formed words in Esperanto are not entirely straightforward; for example, literally "give out", means "publish", paralleling the usage of certain European languages (such as German herausgeben, Dutch uitgeven, Russian издать izdat'‌). In addition, the suffix -um- has no defined meaning; words using the suffix must be learned separately (such as  "to the right" and  "clockwise").

There are not many idiomatic or slang words in Esperanto, as these forms of speech tend to make international communication difficult—working against Esperanto's main goal.

Instead of derivations of Esperanto roots, new roots are taken from European languages in the endeavor to create an international language.

Sample text 

The following short extract gives an idea of the character of Esperanto. (Pronunciation is covered above; the Esperanto letter j is pronounced like English y.)
 Esperanto:
«»
 English translation:
In many places in China, there were temples of the dragon-king. During times of drought, people would pray in the temples that the dragon-king would give rain to the human world. At that time the dragon was a symbol of the supernatural creature. Later on, it became the ancestor of the highest rulers and symbolized the absolute authority of a feudal emperor. The emperor claimed to be the son of the dragon. All of his personal possessions carried the name "dragon" and were decorated with various dragon figures. Now dragon decorations can be seen everywhere in China and legends about dragons circulate.

Simple phrases 
Listed below are some useful Esperanto words and phrases along with IPA transcriptions:

Eurocentricity
The vocabulary, orthography, phonology, and semantics are all thoroughly European. The vocabulary, for example, draws about three-quarters from Romance languages, with the rest split between Greek, English and German.  The phonology is said to be similar to Polish. The language also has many calques of Polish expressions.

Education 

Esperanto speakers learn the language through self-directed study, online tutorials, and correspondence courses taught by volunteers. More recently, free teaching websites like  and  have become available.

Esperanto instruction is rarely available at schools, including four primary schools in a pilot project under the supervision of the University of Manchester, and by one count at a few universities. However, outside China and Hungary, these mostly involve informal arrangements, rather than dedicated departments or state sponsorship. Eötvös Loránd University in Budapest had a department of Interlinguistics and Esperanto from 1966 to 2004, after which time instruction moved to vocational colleges; there are state examinations for Esperanto instructors. Additionally, Adam Mickiewicz University in Poland offers a diploma in Interlinguistics. The Senate of Brazil passed a bill in 2009 that would make Esperanto an optional part of the curriculum in public schools, although mandatory if there is demand for it. , the bill is still under consideration by the Chamber of Deputies.

In the United States, Esperanto is notably offered as a weekly evening course at Stanford University's Bechtel International Center. Conversational Esperanto, The International Language, is a free drop-in class that is open to Stanford students and the general public on campus during the academic year. With administrative permission, Stanford Students can take the class for two credits a quarter through the Linguistics Department. "Even four lessons are enough to get more than just the basics," the Esperanto at Stanford website reads.

Esperanto-USA suggests that Esperanto can be learned in, at most, one quarter of the amount of time required for other languages.

Third-language acquisition 

From 2006 to 2011, four primary schools in Britain, with 230 pupils, followed a course in "propaedeutic Esperanto"—that is, instruction in Esperanto to raise language awareness, and to accelerate subsequent learning of foreign languages—under the supervision of the University of Manchester. As they put it,

Many schools used to teach children the recorder, not to produce a nation of recorder players, but as a preparation for learning other instruments. [We teach] Esperanto, not to produce a nation of Esperanto-speakers, but as a preparation for learning other languages.

The results showed that the pupils achieved enhanced metalinguistic awareness, though the study did not indicate whether a course in a language other than Esperanto would have led to similar results. Similar studies have been conducted in New Zealand, the United States, and Germany. The results of these studies were favorable, and demonstrated that studying Esperanto before another foreign language expedites the acquisition of the other, natural language. In one study in England, a group of European secondary school students studied Esperanto for one year, then French for three years, and ended up with a better command of French than a control group, who had studied French for a four-year period.

Community

Geography and demography 

Esperanto is by far the most widely spoken constructed language in the world. Speakers are most numerous in Europe and East Asia, especially in urban areas, where they often form Esperanto clubs. Esperanto is particularly prevalent in the northern and central countries of Europe; in China, Korea, Japan, and Iran within Asia; in Brazil, and the United States in the Americas; and in Togo in Africa.

Countering a common criticism against Esperanto, the statistician Svend Nielsen has found no significant correlation between the number of Esperanto speakers and the similarity of a given national native language to Esperanto. He concludes that Esperanto tends to be more popular in rich countries with widespread Internet access and a tendency to contribute more to science and culture. Linguistic diversity within a country was found to have no, or perhaps a slightly reductive, correlation with Esperanto popularity.

Number of speakers 
An estimate of the number of Esperanto speakers was made by Sidney S. Culbert, a retired psychology professor at the University of Washington and a longtime Esperantist, who tracked down and tested Esperanto speakers in sample areas in dozens of countries over a period of twenty years. Culbert concluded that between one and two million people speak Esperanto at Foreign Service Level 3, "professionally proficient" (able to communicate moderately complex ideas without hesitation, and to follow speeches, radio broadcasts, etc.). Culbert's estimate was not made for Esperanto alone, but formed part of his listing of estimates for all languages of more than one million speakers, published annually in the World Almanac and Book of Facts. Culbert's most detailed account of his methodology is found in a 1989 letter to David Wolff. Since Culbert never published detailed intermediate results for particular countries and regions, it is difficult to independently gauge the accuracy of his results.

In the Almanac, his estimates for numbers of language speakers were rounded to the nearest million, thus the number of Esperanto speakers is shown as two million. This latter figure appears in Ethnologue. Assuming that this figure is accurate, that means that about 0.03% of the world's population speaks the language. Although it does not meet Zamenhof's goal of a universal language, it still represents a level of popularity unmatched by any other constructed language.

Marcus Sikosek (now Ziko van Dijk) has challenged this figure of 1.6 million as exaggerated. He estimated that even if Esperanto speakers were evenly distributed, assuming one million Esperanto speakers worldwide would lead one to expect about 180 in the city of Cologne. Van Dijk finds only 30 fluent speakers in that city, and similarly smaller-than-expected figures in several other places thought to have a larger-than-average concentration of Esperanto speakers. He also notes that there are a total of about 20,000 members of the various Esperanto organizations (other estimates are higher). Though there are undoubtedly many Esperanto speakers who are not members of any Esperanto organization, he thinks it unlikely that there are fifty times more speakers than organization members.

Finnish linguist Jouko Lindstedt, an expert on native-born Esperanto speakers, presented the following scheme to show the overall proportions of language capabilities within the Esperanto community:
 1,000 have Esperanto as their native family language.
 10,000 speak it fluently.
 100,000 can use it actively.
 One million understand a large amount passively.
 Ten million have studied it to some extent at some time.

In 2017, doctoral student Svend Nielsen estimated around 63,000 Esperanto speakers worldwide, taking into account association memberships, user-generated data from Esperanto websites and census statistics. This number, however, was disputed by statistician Sten Johansson, who questioned the reliability of the source data and highlighted a wide margin of error, the latter point with which Nielsen agrees. Both have stated, however, that this new number is likely more realistic than some earlier projections.

In the absence of Dr. Culbert's detailed sampling data, or any other census data, it is impossible to state the number of speakers with certainty. According to the website of the Universal Esperanto Association:

Numbers of textbooks sold and membership of local societies put "the number of people with some knowledge of the language in the hundreds of thousands and possibly millions".

Native speakers 

Native Esperanto speakers, have learned the language from birth from Esperanto-speaking parents. This usually happens when Esperanto is the chief or only common language in an international family, but sometimes occurs in a family of Esperanto speakers who often use the language. As of 1996, according to Corsetti, there were approximately 350 attested cases of families with native Esperanto speakers (which means there were around 700 Esperanto speaking natives in these families, not accounting for older native speakers). The 2022 edition of Ethnologue gives 1,000 L1 users citing Corsetti et al 2004.

However, native speakers do not occupy an authoritative position in the Esperanto community, as they would in other language communities. This presents a challenge to linguists, whose usual source of grammaticality and meanings are native speakers.

Culture 

Esperantists can access an international culture, including a large body of original as well as translated literature. There are more than 25,000 Esperanto books, both originals and translations, as well as several regularly distributed Esperanto magazines. In 2013 a museum about Esperanto opened in China.

Every year, Esperantists meet for the World Congress of Esperanto.

There is also a variety of classical and semi-classical choral music, both original and translated, as well as large ensemble music that includes voices singing Esperanto texts. Lou Harrison, who incorporated styles and instruments from many world cultures in his music, used Esperanto titles and/or texts in several of his works, most notably  (1973). David Gaines used Esperanto poems as well as an excerpt from a speech by Dr. Zamenhof for his Symphony No. One (Esperanto) for mezzo-soprano and orchestra (1994–98). He wrote original Esperanto text for his  (I Can Cry No Longer) for unaccompanied SATB choir (1994).

There are also shared traditions, such as Zamenhof Day, and shared behaviour patterns. Esperantists speak primarily in Esperanto at international Esperanto meetings.

Esperanto proponents, such as Prof. Humphrey Tonkin of the University of Hartford, argue that Esperanto is "culturally neutral by design, as it was intended to be a facilitator between cultures, not to be the carrier of any one national culture". The late Scottish Esperanto author William Auld wrote extensively on the subject, arguing that Esperanto is "the expression of a common human culture, unencumbered by national frontiers. Thus it is considered a culture on its own." Critics have argued that the language is eurocentric, as it draws much of its vocabulary from European languages.

Esperanto heritage 
Several Esperanto associations also advance education in and about Esperanto and aim to preserve and promote the culture and heritage of Esperanto. Poland added Esperanto to its list of intangible cultural heritage in 2014.

Notable authors in Esperanto 

Some authors of works in Esperanto are:

 Muztar Abbasi (translated the Quran into Esperanto)
 William Auld
 Julio Baghy
 Kazimierz Bein
 Marjorie Boulton
 Jorge Camacho
 Fernando de Diego (mainly translations)
 Vasili Eroshenko
 Jean Forge
 Antoni Grabowski
 Kalman Kalocsay
 Anna Löwenstein
 Kenji Miyazawa (translated his pre-existing works into Esperanto)
 Nikolai Nekrasov
 István Nemere
 Claude Piron
 Edmond Privat
 Frederic Pujulà i Vallès
 Baldur Ragnarsson
 Reto Rossetti
 Raymond Schwartz
 Tibor Sekelj
 Tivadar Soros
 Spomenka Štimec
 Éva Tófalvy
 Vladimir Varankin
 Gaston Waringhien
 L. L. Zamenhof
 Þórbergur Þórðarson

Popular culture 

In the futuristic novel Lord of the World by Robert Hugh Benson, Esperanto is presented as the predominant language of the world, much as Latin is the language of the Church. A reference to Esperanto appears in the science-fiction story War with the Newts by Karel Čapek, published in 1936. As part of a passage on what language the salamander-looking creatures with human cognitive ability should learn, it is noted that "...in the Reform schools, Esperanto was taught as the medium of communication." (P. 206).

Esperanto has been used in many films and novels. Typically, this is done either to add the exotic flavour of a foreign language without representing any particular ethnicity, or to avoid going to the trouble of inventing a new language. The Charlie Chaplin film The Great Dictator (1940) showed Jewish ghetto shop signs in Esperanto. Two full-length feature films have been produced with dialogue entirely in Esperanto: , in 1964, and Incubus, a 1965 B-movie horror film which is also notable for starring William Shatner shortly before he began working on Star Trek. In Captain Fantastic (2016) there is a dialogue in Esperanto. The 1994 film Street Fighter contains Esperanto dialogue spoken by the character Sagat. Finally, Mexican film director Alfonso Cuarón has publicly shown his fascination for Esperanto, going as far as naming his film production company Esperanto Filmoj ("Esperanto Films").

Science 

In 1921 the French Academy of Sciences recommended using Esperanto for international scientific communication. A few scientists and mathematicians, such as Maurice Fréchet (mathematics), John C. Wells (linguistics), Helmar Frank (pedagogy and cybernetics), and Nobel laureate Reinhard Selten (economics) have published part of their work in Esperanto. Frank and Selten were among the founders of the International Academy of Sciences in San Marino, sometimes called the "Esperanto University", where Esperanto is the primary language of teaching and administration.

A message in Esperanto was recorded and included in Voyager 1s Golden Record.

Commerce and trade 
Esperanto business groups have been active for many years. Research conducted in the 1920s by the French Chamber of Commerce and reported in The New York Times suggested that Esperanto seemed to be the best business language.

The privacy-oriented cryptocurrency, Monero, takes its name from the Esperanto word for coin.

Goals of the movement 
Zamenhof had three goals, as he wrote already in 1887: to create an easy language, to create a language ready to use "whether the language be universally accepted or not" and to find some means to get many people to learn the language. So Zamenhof's intention was not only to create an easy-to-learn language to foster peace and international understanding as a general language, but also to create a language for immediate use by a (small) language community. Esperanto was to serve as an international auxiliary language, that is, as a universal second language, not to replace ethnic languages. This goal was shared by Zamenhof among Esperanto speakers at the beginning of the movement. Later, Esperanto speakers began to see the language and the culture that had grown up around it as ends in themselves, even if Esperanto is never adopted by the United Nations or other international organizations.

There are two kinds of finvenkismo: desubismo aims to spread Esperanto between ordinary people (desube, from below) to form a steadily growing community of Esperanto speakers, while desuprismo aims to act from above (desupre), beginning with politicians.
Zamenhof considered the first way more plausible, as "for such affairs as ours, governments come with their approval and help usually only when everything is completely ready."

However the "Manifesto de Raŭmo" clearly mentions the intention to further spread the language: "We want to spread Esperanto to put into effect its positive values more and more, step by step".

In 1996 the Prague Manifesto was adopted at the annual congress of the Universal Esperanto Association (UEA); it was subscribed by individual participants and later by other Esperanto speakers. More recently, language-learning apps like Duolingo and Amikumu have helped to increase the amount of fluent speakers of Esperanto, and find others in their area to speak the language with.

Symbols and flags 

The earliest flag, and the one most commonly used today, features a green five-pointed star against a white canton, upon a field of green. It was proposed to Zamenhof by Richard Geoghegan, author of the first Esperanto textbook for English speakers, in 1887. The flag was approved in 1905 by delegates to the first conference of Esperantists at Boulogne-sur-Mer.

The green star on white is also used by itself as a round (buttonhole, etc.) emblem by many esperantists, among other reasons to enhance their visibility outside the Esperanto world.

A version with an E superimposed over the green star is sometimes seen.
Other variants include that for Christian Esperantists, with a white Christian cross superimposed upon the green star, and that for Leftists, with the color of the field changed from green to red.

In 1987, a second flag design was chosen in a contest organized by the UEA celebrating the first centennial of the language.
It featured a white background with two stylised curved "E"s facing each other.

Politics 
Esperanto has been placed in many proposed political situations.
The most popular of these is the Europe–Democracy–Esperanto, which aims to establish Esperanto as the official language of the European Union.
Grin's Report, published in 2005 by François Grin, found that the use of English as the lingua franca within the European Union costs billions annually and significantly benefits English-speaking countries financially.
The report considered a scenario where Esperanto would be the lingua franca, and found that it would have many advantages, particularly economically speaking, as well as ideologically.

Left-wing currents exist in the wider Esperanto world, mostly organized through the Sennacieca Asocio Tutmonda founded by French theorist Eugène Lanti.
Other notable Esperanto socialists include Nikolai Nekrasov and Vladimir Varankin, both of whom were put to death in October 1938 during the Stalinist repressions. Nekrasov was accused of being "an organizer and leader of a fascist, espionage, terrorist organization of Esperantists."

Religion

Oomoto 
The Oomoto religion encourages the use of Esperanto among its followers and includes Zamenhof as one of its deified spirits.

Baháʼí Faith 
The Baháʼí Faith encourages the use of an auxiliary international language. `Abdu'l-Bahá praised the ideal of Esperanto, and there was an affinity between Esperantists and Baháʼís during the late 19th century and early 20th century.

On February 12, 1913, `Abdu'l-Bahá gave a talk to the Paris Esperanto Society, stating:

Now, praise be to God that Dr. Zamenhof has invented the Esperanto language. It has all the potential qualities of becoming the international means of communication. All of us must be grateful and thankful to him for this noble effort; for in this way he has served his fellowmen well. With untiring effort and self-sacrifice on the part of its devotees Esperanto will become universal. Therefore every one of us must study this language and spread it as far as possible so that day by day it may receive a broader recognition, be accepted by all nations and governments of the world, and become a part of the curriculum in all the public schools. I hope that Esperanto will be adopted as the language of all the future international conferences and congresses, so that all people need acquire only two languages—one their own tongue and the other the international language. Then perfect union will be established between all the people of the world. Consider how difficult it is today to communicate with various nations. If one studies fifty languages one may yet travel through a country and not know the language. Therefore I hope that you will make the utmost effort, so that this language of Esperanto may be widely spread.

Lidia Zamenhof, daughter of L. L. Zamenhof, became a Baháʼí around 1925. James Ferdinand Morton Jr., an early member of the Baháʼí Faith in Greater Boston, was vice-president of the Esperanto League for North America. Ehsan Yarshater, the founding editor of Encyclopædia Iranica, notes how as a child in Iran he learned Esperanto and that when his mother was visiting Haifa on a Baháʼí pilgrimage he wrote her a letter in Persian as well as Esperanto. At the request of 'Abdu’l-Baha, Agnes Baldwin Alexander became an early advocate of Esperanto and used it to spread the Baháʼí teachings at meetings and conferences in Japan.

Today there exists an active sub-community of Baháʼí Esperantists and various volumes of Baháʼí literature have been translated into Esperanto. In 1973, the Baháʼí Esperanto-League for active Baháʼí supporters of Esperanto was founded.

Spiritism 
In 1908, spiritist Camilo Chaigneau wrote an article named "Spiritism and Esperanto" in the periodic La Vie d'Outre-Tombe recommending the use of Esperanto in a "central magazine" for all spiritists and esperantists. Esperanto then became actively promoted by spiritists, at least in Brazil, initially by Ismael Gomes Braga and František Lorenz; the latter is known in Brazil as Francisco Valdomiro Lorenz, and was a pioneer of both spiritist and Esperantist movements in this country. The Brazilian Spiritist Federation publishes Esperanto coursebooks, translations of Spiritism's basic books, and encourages Spiritists to become Esperantists.

William T. Stead, a famous spiritualist and occultist in the United Kingdom, co-founded the first Esperanto club in the U.K.

Theosophy 

The Teozofia Esperanta Ligo (Theosophical Esperantist League) was formed in 1911, and the organization's journal, Espero Teozofia, was published from 1913 to 1928.

Bible translations 
The first translation of the Bible into Esperanto was a translation of the Tanakh (or Old Testament) done by L. L. Zamenhof. The translation was reviewed and compared with other languages' translations by a group of British clergy and scholars before its publication at the British and Foreign Bible Society in 1910. In 1926 this was published along with a New Testament translation, in an edition commonly called the "". In the 1960s, the  tried to organize a new, ecumenical Esperanto Bible version. Since then, the Dutch Remonstrant pastor Gerrit Berveling has translated the Deuterocanonical or apocryphal books, in addition to new translations of the Gospels, some of the New Testament epistles, and some books of the Tanakh.

Christianity 

Christian Esperanto organizations and publications include:

 After a failed attempt to start a Catholic Esperanto organization, Emile Peltier, a parish priest near Tours, France, published the first issue of Espero Katolika (Catholic Hope) in 1902. A year after Peltier's death, the International Union of Catholic Esperantists (Internacia Katolika Unuiĝo Esperantista, IKUE) was formed in 1910. Father Max Metzger founded the World Peace League of the White Cross in 1916 and the German Catholics' Peace Association in 1919, both of which used Esperanto as their working language. Two Roman Catholic popes, John Paul II and Benedict XVI, have regularly used Esperanto in their multilingual  blessings at Easter and Christmas each year since Easter 1994.
 In 1911, The International League of Christian Esperantists (Kristana Esperantista Ligo Internacia, KELI) was founded during the Universal Congress of Esperanto in Anvers. The founder, Paul Hübner (1881-1970), was an early supporter of the Nazi movement, a fact which disenfranchised liberal and Jewish members, thus severely limiting the growth of the KELI during the first half of the 20th century. KELI's bimonthly interdenominational magazine, Dia Regno, continues to be published and is reportedly made available to readers in 48 countries. They have also published several Esperanto hymnals including the 1971 Adoru Kantante (Worship by Singing) and Tero kaj Ĉielo Kantu (Earth and Heaven Sing).
 The Quaker Esperanto Society (Kvakera Esperanto-Societo, KES) was established in 1921 and described in multiple issues of "The Friend" Advices and Queries (Konsiloj kaj Demandoj) and several other Quaker texts have been translated. Well-known Esperantists who were also Quakers include authors and historians, Edmond Privat and Montagu Christie Butler.

 The first Christadelphian publications in Esperanto were published in 1910.
 Chick Publications, a publisher of Protestant fundamentalist-themed evangelistic tracts, has published a number of comic book–style tracts by Jack T. Chick translated into Esperanto, including "This Was Your Life!" ("")
 The Book of Mormon has been partially translated into Esperanto, although the translation has not been officially endorsed by the Church of Jesus Christ of Latter-day Saints. There exists a group of Latter-day Saint Esperantists who distribute church literature in the language.
 There are instances of Christian apologists and teachers using Esperanto as a medium. Nigerian pastor Bayo Afolaranmi's "Spirita nutraĵo" ("spiritual food") Yahoo mailing list, for example, has hosted weekly messages since 2003.

Islam 
Ayatollah Khomeini of Iran called on Muslims to learn Esperanto and praised its use as a medium for better understanding among peoples of different religious backgrounds. After he suggested that Esperanto replace English as an international lingua franca, it began to be used in the seminaries of Qom. An Esperanto translation of the Qur'an was published by the state shortly thereafter.

Modifications 

Several later constructed languages, such as Universal, Saussure, Romániço, Internasia, Esperanto sen Fleksio, and Mundolingvo, were all based on Esperanto.

In modern times, conscious attempts have been made to eliminate perceived sexism in the language, such as Riism. Reforms aimed at altering country names have also resulted in a number of different options, either due to disputes over suffixes or Eurocentrism in naming various countries.

Criticism  

There have been numerous objections to Esperanto over the years. For example, there has been criticism that Esperanto is not neutral enough, but also that it should convey a specific culture, which would make it less neutral; that Esperanto does not draw on a wide enough selection of the world's languages, but also that it should be more narrowly European.

Language-neutrality
Esperantists often argue for Esperanto as a culturally neutral means of communication. However, it is often accused of being Eurocentric. This is most often noted in regard to the vocabulary, but applies equally to the orthography, phonology, and semantics, all of which are largely derived by the grammars of European languages. The vocabulary, for example, draws about three-quarters from Romance languages, and the remainder primarily from Greek, English and German. The grammar is arguably more European than not. Supporters have argued that the agglutinative grammar and verb regularity of Esperanto has more in common with Asian languages than with European ones. A 2010 typological study concluded that "Esperanto is indeed somewhat European in character, but considerably less so than the European languages themselves."

Gender-neutrality

Esperanto is frequently accused of being inherently sexist, because the default form of some nouns is masculine while a derived form is used for the feminine, which is said to retain traces of the male-dominated society of late 19th-century Europe of which Esperanto is a product. These nouns are primarily titles and kin terms, such as sinjoro "Mr, sir" vs. sinjorino "Ms, lady" and patro "father" vs. patrino "mother". In addition, nouns that denote persons and whose definitions are not explicitly male are often assumed to be male unless explicitly made female, such as doktoro, a PhD doctor (male or unspecified) versus doktorino, a female PhD. This is analogous to the situation with the English suffix -ess, as in the words baron/baroness, waiter/waitress, etc. 

On the other hand, the pronoun ĝi ("it") may be used generically to mean he/she/they; the pronoun li ("he") is always masculine and ŝi ("she") is always female, despite some authors' arguments. 
A gender-neutral singular pronoun ri has gradually become more widely used in recent years, although it is not currently universal.
The plural pronoun ili ("they") is always neutral, as are nouns with the prefix ge– such as gesinjoroj (equivalent to sinjoro kaj sinjorino "Mr.and Ms."), gepatroj "parents" (equivalent to patro kaj patrino "mother and father").

Case and number agreement
Speakers of languages without grammatical case or adjectival agreement frequently complain about these aspects of Esperanto. In addition, in the past some people found the Classical Greek forms of the plural (nouns in -oj, adjectives in -aj) to be awkward, proposing instead that Italian -i be used for nouns, and that no plural be used for adjectives. These suggestions were adopted by the Ido reform. A reply to that criticism is that the presence of an accusative case allows much freedom in word order, e.g. for emphasis ("Johano batis Petron", John hit Peter; "Petron batis Johano", it is Peter whom John hit), that its absence in the "predicate of the object" avoids ambiguity ("Mi vidis la blankan domon", I saw the white house; "Mi vidis la domon blanka", the house seemed white to me) and that adjective agreement allows, among others, the use of hyperbaton in poetry (as in Latin, cf. Virgil's Eclogue 1:1 Tityre, tu patulæ recubans sub tegmine fagi… where "patulæ" (spread out) is epithet to "fagi" (beech) and their agreement in the genitive feminine binds them notwithstanding their distance in the verse).

Alphabet 
The Esperanto alphabet uses two diacritics: the circumflex and the breve. The alphabet was designed with a French typewriter in mind, and although modern computers support Unicode, entering the letters with diacritic marks can be more or less problematic with certain operating systems or hardware. One of the first reform proposals (for Esperanto 1894) sought to do away with these marks and the language Ido went back to the basic Latin alphabet.

Achievement of its creator's goals
One common criticism is that Esperanto has failed to live up to the hopes of its creator, who dreamed of it becoming a universal second language. Because people were reluctant to learn a new language which hardly anyone spoke, Zamenhof asked people to sign a promise to start learning Esperanto once ten million people made the same promise. He "was disappointed to receive only a thousand responses."

However, Zamenhof had the goal to "enable the learner to make direct use of his knowledge with persons of any nationality, whether the language be universally accepted or not", as he wrote in 1887. The language is currently spoken by people living in more than 100 countries; there are about 2,000 native Esperanto speakers and probably up to 100,000 people who use the language regularly.

In this regard, Zamenhof was well aware that it might take much time for Esperanto to achieve his desired goals. In his speech at the 1907 World Esperanto Congress in Cambridge he said, "we hope that earlier or later, maybe after many centuries, on a neutral language foundation, understanding one another, the nations will build ... a big family circle."

The poet Wisława Szymborska expressed doubt that Esperanto could "produce works of lasting value," saying it is "an artificial language without variety or dialects" and that "no one thinks in Esperanto." Esperantists have replied that "lasting value" is a statement of opinion, that Esperanto grew "naturally" by the actions of its speakers on Zamenhof's intentionally elementary Fundamento, and that the last sentence ("No one thinks in Esperanto") is false-to-fact.

Continued modification
J. R. R. Tolkien wrote in support of the language in a 1932 British Esperantist article, but criticised those who sought to adapt or "tinker" with the language, which, in his opinion, harmed unanimity and the goal of achieving wide acceptance.

Eponymous entities 

There are some geographical and astronomical features named after Esperanto, or after its creator L. L. Zamenhof. These include Esperanto Island in Antarctica, and the asteroids 1421 Esperanto and 1462 Zamenhof discovered by Finnish astronomer and Esperantist Yrjö Väisälä.

Example text 
Article 1 of the Universal Declaration of Human Rights in Esperanto:
Ĉiuj homoj estas denaske liberaj kaj egalaj laŭ digno kaj rajtoj. Ili posedas racion kaj konsciencon, kaj devus konduti unu al alia en spirito de frateco.

Article 1 of the Universal Declaration of Human Rights in English:
All human beings are born free and equal in dignity and rights. They are endowed with reason and conscience and should act towards one another in a spirit of brotherhood.

See also

Notes

References

Further reading 

 Auld, William. La Fenomeno Esperanto ("The Esperanto Phenomenon"). Rotterdam: Universala Esperanto-Asocio, 1988.
 Butler, Montagu C. Step by Step in Esperanto. ELNA 1965/1991. .
 DeSoto, Clinton (1936). 200 Meters and Down. West Hartford, Connecticut, US: American Radio Relay League, p. 92.
 Crystal, David, article "Esperanto" in The New Penguin Encyclopedia, Penguin Books, 2002.
 Crystal, David, How Language Works (pages 424–5), Penguin Books, 2006. .
 Esperanto  at the Encyclopædia Britannica
 Everson, Michael.  . Evertype, 2001.
 Garvia, Roberto. Esperanto and Its Rivals: The Struggle for an International Language. University of Pennsylvania Press, 2015. .
 Gledhill, Christopher. The Grammar of Esperanto: A Corpus-Based Description. Second edition. Lincom Europa, 2000. .
 Harlow, Don. The Esperanto Book . Self-published on the web (1995–96).
 Esperanto Lessons . LEARN101.ORG. Including the alphabet, adjectives, nouns, plural, gender, numbers, phrases, grammar, vocabulary, verbs, exam, audio, and translation.
 Ludovikologia dokumentaro I  Tokyo: Ludovikito, 1991. Facsimile reprints of the Unua Libro in Russian, Polish, French, German, English and Swedish, with the earliest Esperanto dictionaries for those languages.
 
 Okrent, Arika. In the Land of Invented Languages .
 
 Perlin, Ross "Nostalgia for World Culture: A New History of Esperanto",review of "Bridge of Words" by Esther Schor 
 van Someren, Emily. Republication of the thesis 'The EU Language Regime, Lingual and Translational Problems'.
 Wells, John. Lingvistikaj aspektoj de Esperanto ("Linguistic aspects of Esperanto"). Second edition. Rotterdam: Universala Esperanto-Asocio, 1989.
 Zamenhof, Ludovic Lazarus, Dr. Esperanto's International Language: Introduction & Complete Grammar  The original 1887 Unua Libro, English translation by Richard H. Geoghegan; HTML online version 2006. Print edition (2007) also available from ELNA  or UEA .
 Zamenhof, Ludovic Lazarus. Fundamento de Esperanto . HTML reprint of 1905 Fundamento, from the Academy of Esperanto.

 FM 30-101-1 (1962) Esperanto The Aggressor Language https://commons.wikimedia.org/wiki/File:FM_30-101-1_(1962)_Esperanto_The_Aggressor_Language.pdf

External links 

 UEA.org – Website of the Universal Esperanto Association
 
 Esperanto Bookshelf at Project Gutenberg
 Esperanto dictionary 
 The invented language that found a second life online, a BBC Future article by Jose Luis Penarredonda, 10 January 2018
 Esperanto.events, an overview of worldwide Esperanto events by Eventa Servo (in Esperanto).

 
1887 introductions
Agglutinative languages
Constructed languages
Constructed languages introduced in the 1880s
International auxiliary languages
Multilingualism
International auxiliary languages introduced in the 1880s
Polish inventions